Fry's frog (Austrochaperina fryi) is a species of frog in the family Microhylidae.
It is endemic to Australia.
Its natural habitat is subtropical or tropical moist lowland forests.
It is threatened by habitat loss.

References

 Video: http://www.stream.cz/cestovani-priroda/793967-zvlastni-zaba-vydava-nezvykle-zvuky

Austrochaperina
Amphibians of Queensland
Taxonomy articles created by Polbot
Amphibians described in 1962
Frogs of Australia